Druon Antigoon or Druon Antigonus is a Belgian folkloric character. He was a mythical giant who lived in Antwerp.

Guarding a bridge on the river Scheldt, he exacted a toll from those crossing the river. For those who refused, he severed one of their hands and threw it into the river. Eventually, Antigoon was slain by a young Roman soldier named Brabo, who cut off the giant's own hand and flung it into the river.

According to folklore, and as celebrated by the statue in front of the town hall, this legend is the origin of the name Antwerp: Antwerpen, from Dutch hand werpen—akin to Old English hand and wearpan (= to throw), that has changed to today's warp.

References

Belgian culture
Fictional giants
Medieval legends
Belgian folklore
Fictional characters from Flanders
Belgian legends
Antwerp in fiction